Mahesh Baldi is an Indian politician. He is elected to the Maharashtra Legislative Assembly from Uran, Maharashtra in the 2019 Maharashtra Legislative Assembly election. He contested the election as an independent candidate and announced his support of Bharatiya Janata Party. Also he is doing great work for rural public in Uran panvel area.

References 

Living people
Maharashtra MLAs 2019–2024
Bharatiya Janata Party politicians from Maharashtra
Year of birth missing (living people)